Leo Zogmayer (born 1949, Krems an der Donau, Lower Austria) is an Austrian artist, living and working in Vienna and Krems.

Between 1975 and 1981 he studied at the University of Applied Arts in Vienna at Herbert Tasquil´s master class. His preferred media are drawing, graphic arts, photography, computer drawings, painting and glass painting, sculpture (wood, iron, aluminum, concrete). Since the end of the Eighties, Zogmayer has created art projects that inhabit space in various architectural and urban contexts (New York; Vienna, St. Veit/Salzburg, St. Pölten/Austria; Sonnenhausen, Tübingen/Germany), bordering on design. He has made work for a number of liturgical places, e. g. in churches (Brussels/Belgium; Frankfurt, Bonn, Aschaffenburg/Germany; Graz, Innsbruck/Austria). Between 1998 und 2000 he led a class for aesthetics in space at the International Summer Academy at Topolcianky/Slovakia.
Around 1990 Zogmayer came off the narrative, mimetic, and expressive components of his previous art, realized as painting, drawing, and prints. He then creates objects applied to the wall or set in a room, based on clear stereometric forms which he combines to site-specific installations. 
By the mid-Nineties he radicalized the reductive process in his works, his paintings become the site for words and texts. In his glass paintings single words or short sentences are left free-standing in a monochrome color surface, alternatively, they are engraved in rectangular blocks and cylinders, objects made of aluminum or steel, as well as being realized as large-format installations in public spaces.
Zogmayer´s art deals with different subjects, such as the aesthetic concept of the “beautiful”, its rehabilitation as well as its rejuvenation; furthermore he initiates intercultural discourses, addresses art and spirituality, and maintains a reductive and iconoclastic aesthetic.

Exhibitions
2010 Vienna, Museum of Modern Art Foundation Ludwig, Painting – Process and Expansion
2006 Krems, Kunsthalle, Leo Zogmayer – beautiful
2005 New Delhi, Lalit Kala Akademi, 11. Triennale India
2002 Warsaw, National Museum, Semiotic Landscape
2001 Vienna, Museum of Modern Art Foundation Ludwig, Discursive Painting
2001 Marburg, Kunstverein, Leo Zogmayer – No Image
2000 Bratislava, Galéria Medium, Leo Zogmayer – Space Colour Text
1996 Rome, Palazzo Braschi, Austriaci a Roma
1996 Essen, Museum Folkwang, Positions – Journeys to the Borders of Painting
1991 Vienna, Museum of Modern Art Foundation Ludwig, Leo Zogmayer – Sculpture
1991 Salzburg, Rupertinum, Leo Zogmayer – Sculpture
1991 Essen, Museum Folkwang, Leo Zogmayer – Drawing / Sculpture

Public collections
Museum of Modern Art Foundation Ludwig, Vienna
Graphic Collection Albertina, Vienna
University of Applied Arts, Vienna
Museum of Modern, Salzburg
Lentos, Art Museum Linz
Landesmuseum of Lower Austria, St. Pölten
Museum Liaunig, Neuhaus
Museum Folkwang, Essen
Hedendaagse Kunst, Utrecht
Museum of Contemporary Art, Seoul
Espace de l'Art Concret, Mouans-Sartoux
Fonds d'art contemporain de la Ville de Genève
Museo de Bellas Artes, Santander

Literature
Erste Worte. Gedanken zu Leo Zogmayers Wortbildern. Karl Baier, in: Den Menschen im Blick. Phänomenologische Zugänge. Würzburg 2012
Vom Ausrahmen der Welt. Schauen als Ortsbezogenheit in der Kunst Leo Zogmayers. Dieter Willim. Unpublished dissertation, University Vienna 2010
Project Vienna. How to React to a City. Museum für Applied Arts. Vienna 2010
Leo Zogmayer, Is your journey really necessary? Galerie Vertice. Text: Fernando C. Flórez, Oviedo 2008
Leo Zogmayer, schön/beautiful. Kunsthalle Krems. Talk Leo Zogmayer, Tayfun Belgin. Krems 2006
Leo Zogmayer. Wort-Ding-Bild. Dombergmuseum Freising. Texte: Peter Steiner, K. Baier. Freising 2006
11th Triennale India, The Austrian Contribution. Text: Carl Aigner. New Delhi 2005
Leo Zogmayer. Galerie Medium, Bratislava u. Museum of Modern Art, Passau. Texte: F.X. Baier, Mária Orisková. Bratislava 2000
Leo Zogmayer. Verknüpfende Trennungen. Text: Rainer Fuchs. Klagenfurt 1997
Positionen – Reisen an die Grenzen der Malerei. Museum Folkwang Essen. Essen 1996
Leo Zogmayer, Skulpturen. Museum moderner Kunst Wien, Rupertinum Salzburg und Museum Folkwang Essen. Texte: Gerhard Finckh, Lóránd Hegyi, *Henriette Horny, Dieter Ronte. Wien 1991
Leo Zogmayer, Zeichnungen 1986 - 1991. Museum Folkwang Essen. Texte: Hubertus Froning, Andrea Hofmann. Wien 1991

References

External links
Official website
Basis-wien.at
Kunstaspekte.de

1949 births
Living people